South Grafton may refer to:
South Grafton, Massachusetts
South Grafton, New South Wales
South Grafton, West Virginia